Daniel Pedro Fascioli Álvarez (born March 3, 1967 in Montevideo, Uruguay) is a Uruguayan former football player. He played for clubs in Uruguay, Chile, México and Ecuador.

Teams
  Huracán Buceo
  Deportivo Quito
  Danubio
  Cobreloa
  Deportes Antofagasta
  Veracruz
  Correcaminos UAT
  Veracruz
  Correcaminos UAT

Honours
  Deportes Antofagasta 1996 (2º Top Scorer Copa Chile)

References
 Profile at BDFA 

1967 births
Living people
Uruguayan sportspeople of Italian descent
Uruguayan people of Spanish descent
Footballers from Montevideo
Uruguayan footballers
Uruguayan expatriate footballers
Uruguayan expatriate sportspeople in Chile
Uruguayan expatriate sportspeople in Mexico
Uruguayan expatriate sportspeople in Ecuador
Huracán Buceo players
Danubio F.C. players
C.D. Veracruz footballers
Correcaminos UAT footballers
S.D. Quito footballers
Cobreloa footballers
C.D. Antofagasta footballers
Chilean Primera División players
Liga MX players
Expatriate footballers in Chile
Expatriate footballers in Mexico
Expatriate footballers in Ecuador
Association football forwards